The 3rd Tournament for Bolesław Chrobry Crown - First King of Poland was the 2010 version of the Bolesław Chrobry Tournament. It took place on 29 May at the Start Gniezno Stadium in Gniezno, Poland. The Tournament was won by Pole Tomasz Gollob, who beat Rune Holta, Nicki Pedersen and Greg Hancock in the final.

Heat details 

 29 May 2010 (Saturday)
 Best Time: 63.07 secs. - Tomasz Gollob in Heat 3
 Attendance: 8,500
 Referee:  Grzegorz Sokołowski (Ostrów Wielkopolski)

See also 
 motorcycle speedway
 2010 in sports

References

External links 
 (Polish) Official webside

Boleslaw Chrobry Tournament
Bolesław Chrobry Tournament